Pokhara Airport  is a domestic airport serving Pokhara in Nepal. Pokhara Airport will be gradually replaced by Nepal's third international airport, Pokhara International Airport, in 2023. While most operations were transferred to the new airport on 1 January 2023, the STOL-operations to Jomsom are still operated from this airport.

History
The airport was established on 4 July 1958 by the Civil Aviation Authority of Nepal. Until the 2010s, it offered regular connections to Kathmandu and Jomsom; and seasonal connections to Manang. In 2011 Buddha Air, a Nepali private airline, began international flights from Pokhara to Chaudhary Charan Singh International Airport in Lucknow, India, and announced plans to fly to New Delhi's Indira Gandhi International Airport in the future. However these international flights were discontinued soon after.

In the late 2010s, Pokhara Airpot became Nepal's second domestic hub handling flights to various provinces.

In 2023, the airport will gradually be replaced by Pokhara International Airport.

Facilities
The apron of the airport is relatively small and can only handle eight propeller planes at a time. Pokhara Airport is a diversion airport for the country's main airport in Kathmandu in times of problems such as fog. Due to a short runway and crowded apron, flights must often be re-diverted to third airports with even shorter runways.

Airlines and destinations

Several Ultralight aviation companies offer recreational and sightseeing flights from Pokhara Airport.

Statistics

Incidents and accidents
On 6 November 1997, a Necon Air Avro 748-100 had a hydraulic failure after landing from a flight from Kathmandu Airport. The pilot attempted to steer the plane, but it hit another stationary Hawker Siddeley HS 748. There were no fatalities among the four crew members and 44 passengers.
On 22 August 2002, a Shangri-La Air Twin Otter aircraft, on a flight from Jomsom to Pokhara, crashed into a hill that was under complete cloud cover following three days of continuous rain. All three crew and 15 passengers were killed.
 On 16 February 2014, Nepal Airlines Flight 183 crashed shortly after taking off for a flight Pokhara to Jumla Airport. The crash in bad weather killed all the 18 on board.
On 15 January 2023, Yeti Airlines Flight 691 crashed in the vicinity the airfield in Gharipatan, Pokhara, before landing at Pokhara International Airport from Kathmandu Airport. There were no survivors.

See also

 Pokhara International Airport
List of airports in Nepal

References

External links

Pokhara flights schedule
Ultralight Flight from Pokhara Airport
 

Airports in Nepal
1958 establishments in Nepal
Buildings and structures in Pokhara
Airports established in 1958
Transport in Pokhara